The 2021 Deutsche Tourenwagen Masters was the thirty-fifth season of premier German touring car championship and also twenty-second season under the moniker of Deutsche Tourenwagen Masters since the series' resumption in 2000.

It was the first season of the DTM to be run under Group GT3 regulations, following the costly two-year "Class 1 Touring Cars" venture that led to Audi and BMW withdrawing manufacturer support from the series.

Maximilian Götz won the drivers' championship in the last race, surrounded by a controversy due to a first-corner collision between his rivals Kelvin van der Linde and Liam Lawson, as well as team orders imposed by Mercedes-AMG in the closing laps.

Rule changes

Technical
 After two seasons raced under "Class 1" formula format, the series officially transitioned to FIA GT3 regulation, using its own Balance of Performance. The move from Class 1 to GT3 attracted more manufacturers and teams that couldn't previously compete in the series due to high cost. The Class 1 format cars and 2.0-litre (122 cubic inches) turbocharged inline-4 engines that were used in 2019 and 2020 were permanently retired.
 After ten seasons, Hankook terminated their tyre supplier contract with the DTM despite being under contract until 2023. On 1 March 2021, it was announced that Michelin was to provide tyres for the 2021 season.

Sporting
For the first time since 2001, the series no longer utilises standing starts for the commencement of races. Instead the series introduced its so-called "DTM formation start" in a rolling double-file formation.

Teams and drivers
All teams competed with tyres supplied by Michelin.

Manufacturer changes
Mercedes-Benz returned to the series after two years of absence, but acted as a privateer manufacturer.
Ferrari, McLaren and Lamborghini joined the series for the first time, but acted as privateer manufacturers.
Audi and BMW remained in the series, but acted as privateer manufacturers.

Team changes
 Hong Kong sports car team GruppeM Racing joined the series for the first time by fielding a Mercedes-AMG GT3 Evo car.
 Italian sports car team AF Corse joined the series with backing from Red Bull and AlphaTauri by fielding two Ferrari 488 GT3 Evo 2020 machines.
 German sports car team Haupt Racing Team joined the series for the first time by fielding two Mercedes-AMG GT3 Evo cars.
 American sports car team HTP Winward Motorsport joined the series for the first time by fielding two Mercedes-AMG GT3 Evo cars.
 German sports car team ROWE Racing joined the series for the first time by fielding two BMW M6 GT3 cars.
 Polish JP Motorsport joined the series for the first time by fielding a McLaren 720S GT3 car, but only as a guest participant at three rounds.
 German sports car team T3 Motorsport joined the series for the first time by fielding two Lamborghini Huracán GT3 Evo cars.

Driver changes

Entering DTM
Former Red Bull Formula One driver Alex Albon and Formula 2 driver and Red Bull Junior Team member Liam Lawson entered the series with the Red Bull-backed AF Corse team. Lawson contested the full season combining it with an entry in the Formula 2 Championship, while Albon was scheduled to compete in selected races where they did not clash with Formula One Grand Prix weekends due to his commitments as Red Bull Racing's test and reserve driver. Eventually, Albon only missed the final round at the Norisring, where he was replaced by former Super Formula, Super GT, and current Formula E driver Nick Cassidy.

Gary Paffett was set to come back to the DTM after a two-year absence driving for Mercedes-AMG Team Mücke Motorsport, with Maximilian Buhk standing in for him in two rounds due to Formula E commitments. He was eventually forced to abandon these plans because of the COVID-19 restrictions though, and Buhk saw out the season.

Leaving DTM
Robert Kubica left the series after one season. Three times DTM champion René Rast left the championship for Formula E Audi full-time entry.

Race calendar
A preliminary nine-round, eighteen-race calendar was announced on 6 November 2020; four rounds were to be held in Germany, with the remaining five held across Europe.

Igora Drive, Monza and the Norisring – all of which were scheduled to hold events in 2020, before their respective cancellations due to the COVID-19 pandemic – returned to the calendar, and the Red Bull Ring will hold a round for the first time since 2018. All circuits that held events in 2020 will return in 2021, with the exception of Spa-Francorchamps; Anderstorp and Brands Hatch will also not return, after their rounds were cancelled due to the COVID-19 pandemic. Igora Drive was cancelled and DTM published a new calendar for the 2021 season. The inclusion of the Norisring round was uncertain as the season began in mid-June and it missed its traditional spot in early July, before it was re-added to the calendar to be held in October as the final round of the season.

Results and standings

Season summary

Scoring system
Points were awarded to the top ten classified finishers as follows:

Additionally, the top three placed drivers in qualifying also received points:

Drivers' championship

Teams' championship

Manufacturers' championship 
Only points scored by the top three drivers of a manufacturer in qualifyings and races count for the manufacturers' championship.

Notes

References

External links
  

Deutsche Tourenwagen Masters seasons
Deutsche Tourenwagen Masters
Deutsche Tourenwagen Masters
2021